Cathedral Quarter may refer to

Cathedral Quarter, Belfast
Cathedral Quarter, Derby
Cathedral Quarter, Sheffield